Gillian Dobbie is a New Zealand computer scientist. She is a professor at the University of Auckland and the Director of the Auckland ICT Graduate School. She is also a visiting professor at National University of Singapore and on the advisory board of the Victoria University of Wellington. Her main research interests are big data, stream data mining, keyword queries, data management, and software engineering. She convenes the Mathematical and Information Sciences panel for the Marsden Fund of the New Zealand Royal Society.

Selected works 
 Jacky W. W. Wan and Gillian Dobbie. 2003. Extracting association rules from XML documents using XQuery. In Proceedings of the 5th ACM international workshop on Web information and data management (WIDM '03). ACM, New York, NY, USA, 94–97. (https://dx.doi.org/10.1145/956699.956720)
 Shafiq Alam, Gillian Dobbie, Yun Sing Koh, Patricia Riddle, Saeed Ur Rehman, Research on particle swarm optimization based clustering: A systematic review of literature and techniques, Swarm and Evolutionary Computation, Volume 17, 2014, Pages 1–13, ISSN 2210-6502, (https://dx.doi.org/10.1016/j.swevo.2014.02.001)

References

External links
 
 
 Institutional Homepage
 DBLP references page for Gillian Dobbie

Living people
New Zealand women academics
New Zealand women scientists
20th-century women scientists
Academic staff of the University of Auckland
New Zealand computer scientists
New Zealand non-fiction writers
20th-century New Zealand women writers
Year of birth missing (living people)